USS Frances was a United States Navy sloop in commission from 1813 to 1814. 

Commodore Thomas Macdonough (1783–1825) hired Frances in 1813 for use on Lake Champlain during the War of 1812. Outfitted with five guns, she probably was used to transport supplies. Frances was returned to her owner in 1814.

References
 

Sloops of the United States Navy
War of 1812 ships of the United States
1813 ships